is a passenger railway station located in the city of Ōsakasayama, Osaka Prefecture, Japan, operated by the private railway operator Nankai Electric Railway. It has the station number "NK66".

Lines

Layout
The station consists of two ground-level island platforms connected by an elevated station building.

Platforms

Adjacent stations

History
Kongō Station opened on April 19, 1937.

Passenger statistics
In fiscal 2019, the station was used by an average of 32,893 passengers daily.

Surrounding area
 Kongō New Town
 Aeon Kongo store
 Osaka Prefectural Sayama High School

See also
 List of railway stations in Japan

References

External links

Kongō Station from Nankai Electric Railway website  

Railway stations in Japan opened in 1937
Railway stations in Osaka Prefecture
 Ōsakasayama